This is a list of daimyōs from the Sengoku period of Japan.

Tōhoku region

Mutsu Province

Nanbu clan, Tsugaru clan, Hirosaki Castle
 Nanbu Nobunao
 Nanbu Toshinao
 Tsugaru Tamenobu

Dewa Province

Date Clan, Yonezawa Castle / Iwadeyama Castle 
 Date Harumune
 Date Terumune
 Date Masamune
 Date Sanemoto
 Date Shigezane
 Date Hidemune
 Katakura Kojūrō: Shiroishi Castle
 Katakura Shigenaga
 Oniniwa Tsunamoto
 Oniniwa Yoshinao
 Rusu Masakage: Iwakiri Castle
 Hasekura Tsunenaga
 Kasai Harunobu
 Shiroishi Munezane
 Ōuchi Sadatsuna: Obama Castle

Mogami Clan, Yamagata Castle 
 Mogami Yoshimori
 Mogami Yoshiaki
 Mogami Yoshiyasu
 Shimura Akiyasu
 Sakenobe Hidetsuna
 Shimura Mitsuyasu
 Tateoka Mitsushige
 Tateoka Mitsunao
 Andō Chikasue

Ashina Clan, Aizu-Wakamatsu Castle 
 Ashina Moriuji
 Ashina Moritaka
 Ashina Morikiyo
 Inawashiro Morikuni
 Iwashiro Morikuni
 Matsumoto Ujisuke
 Ishikawa Akimitsu

Satake Clan, Kubota Castle 
 Satake Yoshishige
 Satake Yoshinobu
 Satake Yoshihisa
 Satake Yoshihiro/Ashina Morishige

Tamura clan, Miharu Castle
 Tamura Kiyoaki

Sōma clan, Nakamura Castle 
 Soma Yoshitane
 Soma Moritane
 Soma Takatane
 Soma Satotane

Kantō region

Uesugi clan, HIrai Castle 

 Uesugi Noromasa
 Nagano Narimasa : Minowa Castle

Shimōsa Province 

 Ashikaga Yoshiuji
 Ashikaga Ujinohime

Awa Province

Satomi clan, Kururi Castle later Tateyama Castle
 Satomi Sanetaka
 Satomi Yoshitoyo
 Satomi Yoshitaka
 Satomi Yoshihiro
 Satomi Yoshiyori
 Satomi Yoshiyasu
 Satomi Tadayoshi

Sagami Province

Late Hōjō clan, Odawara Castle 
 Hōjō Sōun : Nirayama Castle
 Hōjō Ujitsuna
 Hōjō Genan
 Hōjō Ujiyasu
 Hōjō Tsunashige : Tamanawa Castle
 Hōjō Ujimasa
 Hōjō Ujiteru : Takiyama Castle, Hachiōji Castle
 Hōjō Ujikuni : Hachigata Castle
 Hōjō Ujinao
 Hōjō Ujinori
 Hayakawa-dono
 Narita Ujinaga
 Narita Nagachika
 Chiba Naoshige : Moto Sakura Castle
 Kasahara Masataka : Kozukue Castle
 Tame Mototada
 Hara Tanenaga
 Daidōji Masashige : Matsuida Castle
 Matsuda Norihide
 Itō Masayo
 Toyama Naokage

Chūbu Region

Shinano Province

Sanada Clan, Sanada-shi Yakata, Ueda Castle 
 Sanada Masayuki
 Sanada Yukitaka
 Sanada Nobutsuna
 Sanada Nobuyuki
 Sanada Yukimura
 Komatsuhime
 Chikurin-in
 Karasawa Genba
 Takanashi Naiki
 Yazawa Yorisada
 Yazawa Yoriyasu
 Suzuki Shigenori
Suzuki Tadashige
Ten Sanada braves
Murakami Clan, Katsurao Castle
 Murakami Yoshikiyo
 Murakami Kunikiyo/Yamaura Kagekuni
Ogasawara Clan, Fukashi Castle
 Ogasawara Nagatoki
 Ogasawara Sadayoshi
 Ogasawara Sadatsugu
 Ogasawara Nobusada
Suwa Clan, Uehara Castle
 Suwa Yorishige
 Suwa Yoritaka
 Takatō Yoritsugu
 Takatō Yorimune
Kiso Clan
 Kiso Yoshiyasu
Other Clans opposing Takeda Shingen
 Takanashi Masayori
 Ōi Sadataka (大井貞隆)
 Ōi Sadakiyo (大井貞清)

Echigo Province

Nagao/Uesugi Clan, Kasugayama Castle 
 Uesugi Kenshin : Tochio Castle, Kasugayama Castle
 Uesugi Kagekatsu
 Uesugi Norimasa
 Uesugi Kagetora
 Naoe Kanetsugu
 Naoe Kagetsuna
 Nagao Fujikage
 Nagao Masakage
 Kakizaki Kageie
 Honjō Shigenaga
 Irobe Katsunaga
 Murakami Yoshikiyo
 Kojima Yatarō
 Usami Sadamitsu
 Jōjō Masashige
 Saitō Tomonobu
 Amakasu Kagemochi
 Kitajō Takahiro
 Kitajō Kagehiro
 Nagano Narimasa
 Yasuda Nagahide
 Yasuda Akimoto

Mino Province

Saitō clan, Inabayama Castle 
 Saitō Dōsan
 Saitō Yoshitatsu
 Saitō Tatsuoki
 Akechi Mitsuhide
 Takenaka Shigeharu
 Takenaka Shigenori
 Hachiya Yoritaka
 Hineno Hironari
 Inaba Yoshimichi
 Ujiie Naotomo
 Andō Morinari
 Nagai Michitoshi
 Ujiie Yukihiro
 Ujiie Naomasa

Suruga Province

Imagawa Clan, Imagawa Yakata 
 Imagawa Yoshimoto
 Imagawa Ujizane
 Okabe Motonobu
 Udono Nagateru
 Asahina Yasutomo
 Ihara Tadaharu
 Katsurayama Ujimoto
Otazu no kata
 Iio Tsuratatsu
 Iio Noritsura
 Azai Masatoshi
 Miura Yoshinari
 Matsui Munenobu

Owari Province

Oda Clan, Kiyosu Castle, Komakiyama Castle, Gifu Castle, Azuchi Castle 
 Oda Nobuhide
 Oda Nobutoki
 Oda Nobunaga
 Oda Nobutada
 Oda Nobutaka
 Oda Nobukatsu
 Akechi Mitsuhide
 Hashiba Hideyoshi
 Niwa Nagahide
 Takigawa Kazumasu
 Shibata Katsuie
 Sassa Narimasa
 Tsuda Nobusumi
 Kanamori Nagachika
 Maeda Toshinaga
 Maeda Toshiie
 Maeda Keiji
 Hirate Hirohide
 Sakuma Nobumori
 Kajikawa Kazuhide
 Murai Sadakatsu
 Hasegawa Hidekazu
 Harada Naomasa
 Yamauchi Kazutoyo
 Ikeda Tsuneoki
 Ikeda Terumasa
 Fuwa Mitsuharu
 Mori Yoshinari
 Mori Nagayoshi

Ise Province

Kitabatake clan, Kitabatakeshi Jōkan  
 Kitabatake Tomonori

Mikawa Province

Matsudaira (later Tokugawa) Clan, Okazaki Castle 
 Matsudaira Hirotada
 Matsudaira Ietada
 Matsudaira Kiyoyasu
 Tokugawa Ieyasu
 Tokugawa Hidetada
 Tokugawa Komatsu
 Sakai Tadatsugu
 Honda Tadakatsu
 Honda Komatsu
 Honda Tadatomo
 Honda Tadamasa
 Hattori Hanzō
 Sakakibara Yasumasa
 Sakakibara Ujimasa
 Ii Naomasa
 Ishikawa Kazumasa
 Torii Mototada
 Watanabe Moritsuna
 Honda Shigetsugu
 Saitō Toshiharu
 Honda Masanobu
 Okudaira Nobumasa
 Ōkubo Tadayo
 Ōkubo Tadachika
 Mizuno Tadashige
 Mizuno Katsushige
 Mizuno Katsunari
 Mizuno Nobumoto
 Hosokawa Tadaoki
 Natsume Yoshinobu
 Naitō Kiyonori
 Kyōgoku Takatsugu
 Kyōgoku Takatomo
 Matsudaira Tadamasa
 Matsudaira Nobuyasu
 Itakura Katsushige
 Matsudaira Yasutada
 Hiraiwa Chikayoshi
 Yoda Nobushige
 Oda Nagamasu

Kai Province

Takeda clan, Tsutsujigasaki Castle/Yōgaiyama Castle 
 Takeda Nobutora
 Takeda Nobuyoshi
 Takeda Shingen
 Takeda Katsuyori
 Takeda Nobushige
 Takeda Nobutoyo
 Takeda Nobukado

Hokuriku region

Echizen Province

Asakura Clan, Ichijōdani Castle 
 Asakura Yoshikage
 Asakura Kagetake
 Asakura Kagenori
 Asakura Kageakira
 Kawai Yoshimune
 Asakura Kagetake
 Asakura Norikage
 Makara Naotaka
Maeba Yoshitsugu
Magara Naozumi
Magara Naotaka

Eitchū Province

Jimbo clan, Toyama Castle, Tomisaki Castle 
 Jimbo Nagamoto

Kaga Province 
 Togashi Masachika

Noto Province

Hatakeyama clan, Nanao Castle 
 Hatakeyama Yoshifusa
 Hatakeyama Yoshitsugu
 Hatakeyama Yoshitsuna
 Hatakeyama Yoshinori
 Hatakeyama Yoshitaka
 Chō Tsugutsura
 Yusa Tsugumitsu
 Nukui Kagetaka

Kansai region

Yamashiro Province (Kyoto)

Ashikaga Shogunate, Muromachi Palace 
 Ashikaga Yoshiteru
 Ashikaga Yoshiaki
 Isshiki Fujinaga
 Ōdate Chikanaga
 Ninagawa Chikanaga
 Kyōgoku Takayoshi
 Hosokawa Fujitaka
 Tsukahara Bokuden
 Wada Koremasa

Kawachi Province

Miyoshi clan, Akutagawayama Castle/ Later Iimoriyama Castle 
 Miyoshi Nagayoshi
 Miyoshi Motonaga
 Miyoshi Yoshikata
 Miyoshi Yoshitsugu
 Atagi Fuyuyasu
 Atagi Nobuyasu
 Sogō Kazumasa : Shōzui Castle
 Sogō Masayasu
 Miyoshi Nagayasu
 Miyoshi Masayasu
 Iwanari Tomomichi
 Matsunaga Hisahide : Shigisan Castle
 Matsunaga Hisamichi
 Miyoshi Nagaharu
 Shinohara Nagafusa
 Inoue Michikatsu

Harima Province

Kodera clan, Gochaku Castile, Himeji Castle 
 Kodera Masamoto
 Kuroda Mototaka : Mega Castle
 Kuroda Kanbei

Akamatsu clan, Okishio Castle 
 Akamatsu Harumasa
 Akamatsu Yoshisuke
 Akamatsu Masanori
 Tōshōin
 Akamatsu Yoshisuke
 Akamatsu Masahide

Tajima Province

Yamana clan, Konosumiyama Castle, Arikoyama Castle 
 Yamana Suketoyo

Tanba Province

Akai Clan, Kuroi Castle
 Akai Naomasa

Hatano Clan, Yakami Castle
 Hatano Hideharu

Kii Province

Saika clan & Saika Renegades, Saikazaki
 Suzuki Magoichi
 Suzuki Sadayū
 Suzuki Shigetomo
 Suzuki Magoroku
 Satake Yoshimasa

Settsu Province

The Three Shugo of Settsu

Ikeda Clan (Ikeda Katsumasa) 
Ikeda Nagamasa
 Ikeda Tomomasa
 Araki Murashige
 Nakagawa Kiyohide

Wada Clan (Wada Koremasa) 
Wada Korenaga
 Ibaraki Shigetomo
 Takayama Tomoteru
 Takayama Shigetomo

Itami Clan (Itami Chikaoki)

Ishiyama Hongan-ji (until 1580) 
 Kennyo Hongan-ji
 Shichiri Yorichika
 Ganshōji Shōkei
 Shimozuma Rairen
 Shimozuma Rairyū
 Shimozuma Chūkō
 Shimozuma Raisho
 Shimozuma Shōshin

Yamato Province

Tsutsui clan, Tsustui Castle/ Kōriyama Castle 
 Tsutsui Junkei
 Mori Yoshiyuki
 Shima Sakon
 Matsukura Shigenobu
 Ido Yoshihiro
 Jimyōji Junkoku
 Jimyōji Sadatsugu

Matsunaga clan, Shigisan Castle, Tamonyama Castle 
 Matsunaga Hisahide
 Matsunaga Hisamichi
 Yagyū Munetoshi : Yagyū Castle
 Yagyū Munenori

Ōmi Province

Azai Clan, Odani Castle 
 Azai Hisamasa
 Azai Nagamasa
 Tōdō Takatora
 Akao Kiyotsuna
 Miyabe Keijun
 Kaiho Tsunachika
 Isono Kazumasa
 Ōgawa Suketada
 Atsuji Sadayuki
 Endo Naotsune

Rokkaku Clan, Kannonji Castle 
 Rokkaku Yoshikata
 Rokkaku Yoshisada
 Rokkaku Yoshiharu
 Gamō Katahide : Hino Castle
 Gamo Sadahide
 Hirai Sadatake
 Hirai Takaaki
 Mikumo Shigemochi : MIkumo Castle

Chūgoku Region

Bingo Province 
 Hayashi Narinaga
 Mimura Masachika

Inaba Province

Yamana clan, Tottori Castle
 Yamana Toyokuni

Izumo Province

Amago Clan, Gassantoda Castle 
 Amago Haruhisa
 Amago Yoshihisa
 Amago Tsunehisa
 Amago Masahisa
 Amago Hidehisa
 Amago Katsuhisa
 Uyama Hisakane
 Tachihara Hisatsuna
 Yamanaka Yukimori : Wakasa Oniga Castle
 Yamanaka Mitsuyuki

Suō Province

Ōuchi Clan Ōuchi-shi Yakata/ Kōnomine Castle
 Ōuchi Yoshitaka
 Ōuchi Yoshioki
 Amano Takaakira
 Aokage Takashige
 Masuda Fujikane
 Yoshimi Masayori
 Kii Nagafusa
 Kii Shigefusa
 Sue Harukata
 Hironaka Takakane
 Kakinami Takamasa
 Shirai Katatane
 Miura Fusakiyo
 Nogami Fusatada
 Sue Okifusa
 Sue Nagafusa
 Sugi Shigenori
 Sugi Takayasu

Bizen Province

Uragami Clan, Tenjinyama Castle 
 Uragami Munekage
 Gotō Katsumoto
 Takeuchi Hisamori
 Shimaura Morizane
 Akashi Kagechika
 Nobuhara Kageyoshi

Ukita clan , Otogo Castle, Numa Castle, Okayama Castle 
 Ukita Naoie
 Ukita Tadaie
 Ukita Hideie
 Oka Toshikatsu
 Osafune Sadachika
 Togawa Hideyasu
 Hanabusa Masayuki

Mimura clan

Matsuda clan

Aki Province

Mori Clan, Yoshida-Kōriyama Castle 
 Mōri Motonari ; Sarugake Castle, Yoshida-Kōriyama Castle
 Mōri Okimoto
 Mōri Takamoto 
 Kikkawa Motoharu : Hinoyama Castle
 Kobayakawa Takakage : Niitakayama Castle
 Kobayakawa Hideaki
 Mōri Terumoto : Hiroshima Castle
 Mōri Hidemoto
 Nomi Munekatsu
 Ankokuji Ekei
 Kuchiba Michiyoshi
 Katsura Motozumi
 Kumagai Nobunao : Miiri-Takamatsu Castle
 Shishido Takaie
 Shimizu Muneharu : Takamatsu Castle (Bitchū)
 Kunishi Motosuke
 Kodama Narihide
 Kodama Naritaka
 Fukubara Sadatoshi : Suzuo Castle

Chūgoku Murakami Clan 
Noshima Branch / Noshima Castle
 Murakami Takeyoshi
 Murakami Motoyoshi
Innoshima Branch
 Murakami Yoshimitsu (Innoshima Yoshimitsu)
 Innoshima Sukeyasu
 Innoshima Kagetaka
 Innoshima Yoshisuke
Kurujima Branch
 Murakami Michiyasu
 Murakami Michifusa

Shikoku Region

Sogō clan / Sogō Castle, Shōzui Castle
 Sogō Kageshige
 Sogō Kazumasa
 Sogō Masayasu
 Sogō Nagayasu

Ueta clan / Toda Castle
Ueta Yasunobu

Kagawa clan / Amagiri Castle
Kagawa Nobukage
Kagawa Chikakazu

Kōzai clan / Katsuga Castle

Chōsokabe clan, Okō Castle 
 Chōsokabe Kunichika
 Chōsokabe Motochika
 Chōsokabe Morichika
 Chōsokabe Chikayasu
 Chōsokabe Chikayoshi
 Kira Chikazane : Kira Castle
 Tani Tadazumi
 Kagawa Chikakazu
 Hisatake Chikanobu
 Hisatake Chikanao
 Fukutome Yoshishige
 Kuwana Yoshinari
 Toyonaga Katsumoto
 Yoshida Sadashige
 Yoshida Masashige
 Nakajima Bekonosuke
 Kōsokabe Chikayasu : Aki Castle

Ichijō clan, Nakamura Castle 
 Ichijō Kanesada
 Motoyama Shigemune : Asakura Castle
 Aki Kunitora
 Kumon Shigetada
 Kubokawa Toshimitsu
 Doi Sōsan

Kyūshū

Satsuma Province

Shimazu clan, Izaku Castle / Ichiuji Castle / Uchi Castle
 Shimazu Tadayoshi
 Shimazu Takahisa
 Shimazu Yoshihisa : Kokubu Castle
 Shimazu Yoshihiro : Iino Castle
 Shimazu Iehisa
 Shimazu Teruhisa
 Shimazu Toyohisa
 Shimazu Toshihisa
 Shimazu Tadanaga
 Shimazu Tadatoki
 Ijuin Tadamune
 Niiro Tadamoto
 Yamada Arinobu
 Arima Harunobu
 Ei Hisatora
 Akizuki Tanezane
 Tanegashima Hisatoki
 Hoshino Yoshizane
 Hoshino Yoshikane

Kawachi Province

Itō clan, Tonokōri Castle/Sadowara Castle (Obi Castle under Toyotomi rule) 
 Itō Yoshisuke
 Itō Suketaka
 Itō Sukeyoshi
 Kawasaki Sukenaga
 Kiwaki Sukemori
 Sukemasa Nagakura

Bungo & Buzen Province

Ōtomo Clan, Funai Castle 
 Ōtomo Sōrin
 Otomo Yoshimune
 Ichimada Shigezane
 Ichimada Akizane
 Tawara Chikataka
 Yoshihiro Shigenobu
 Yoshihiro Muneyuki
 Uchida Shigeie
 Watanabe Noritsuna
 Eguchi Genba
 Miike Shigezane
 Saeki Korenori
 Kitahara Taneoki

Tachibana & Takahashi clans, Tachibana castle 
 Tachibana Dōsetsu
 Takahashi Jōun
 Tachibana Ginchiyo
 Tachibana Muneshige
 Tachibana Naotsugu

Hizen Province

Ryūzōji clan, Muranaka Castle 
 Ryūzōji Takanobu
 Ryuzoji Yasufusa
 Nabeshima Naoshige
 Ogawa Nobutoshi
 Eriguchi Nobutsune
 Ōmura Sumitada
 Ishii Nobuyasu
 Kinoshita Masanao
 Enjōji Nobutane

Sagara clan, Minamata Castle 
 Sagara Yoshihi
 Marume Nagayoshi

References

Sengoku period
Daimyo